Gyula Kiss (4 May 1916 – 12 December 1959) was a Hungarian international football player. He was born in Budapest, and played for the club Ferencvárosi TC. He participated with the Hungary national football team at the 1936 Summer Olympics in Berlin.

Kiss later enjoyed a career as a manager. He managed Budapest Honvéd at the height of their success during the 1950s.

References

External links

1916 births
1959 deaths
Footballers at the 1936 Summer Olympics
Olympic footballers of Hungary
Hungarian footballers
Association football forwards
Hungary international footballers
Ferencvárosi TC footballers
Footballers from Budapest